Maryland elected its members October 7, 1822.

See also 
 1823 Maryland's 5th congressional district special elections
 1822 and 1823 United States House of Representatives elections
 List of United States representatives from Maryland

References 

1822
Maryland
United States House of Representatives